Kashida or Kasheeda ("extended", "stretched", "lengthened") is a type of justification in the Arabic language and in some descendant cursive scripts. In contrast to white-space justification, which increases the length of a line of text by expanding spaces between words or individual letters, kasheeda creates justification by elongating characters at certain points. Kasheeda justification can be combined with white-space justification.

The analog in European (Latin-based) typography (expanding or contracting letters to improve spacing) is sometimes called expansion, and falls within microtypography. Kasheeda is considerably easier and more flexible, however, because Arabic-Persian scripts feature prominent horizontal strokes, whose lengths are accordingly flexible.

Kasheeda can also refer to a character that represents this elongation (ـ) – also known as tatweel or taṭwīl ( taṭwīl) – or to one of a set of glyphs of varying lengths that implement this elongation in a font.  The Unicode standard assigns code point U+0640 as Arabic Tatweel.

The kasheeda can take a subtle downward curvature in some calligraphic styles and handwriting. However, the curvilinear stroke is not feasible for most basic fonts, which merely use a completely flat underscore-like stroke for kashida.

In addition to letter spacing and justification, calligraphers also use kasheeda for emphasis and as book or chapter titles.
In modern Arabic mathematical notation, kasheeda appears in some operation symbols that must stretch to accommodate associated contents above or below.

Kasheeda generally only appears in one word per line, and one letter per word. Furthermore, experts recommend kasheeda only between certain combinations of letters (typically those that cannot form a ligature). Some calligraphers who were paid by the page used an inordinate number of kasheeda to stretch content over more pages.

The branding of the 2022 FIFA World Cup in Qatar applies kasheeda to Latin script, connecting the bottom of the "t" and the second "a" in the host country's name.

See also 
 Microtypography
 Word heaping

References

External links 
 Justifying Text using Cascading Style Sheets (CSS) in Internet Explorer 5.5

Arabic punctuation and symbols
Typography